TheBlaze is an American news and entertainment company founded by Glenn Beck.

The Blaze may also refer to:

Radio stations 
KASC (AM) (1330 AM, "The Blaze 1330 AM"), the student-operated radio station of Arizona State University in Tempe, Arizona
KBAZ (96.3 FM, "The Blaze"), a commercial radio station in Hamilton, Montana
KIBZ (104.1 FM, "The Blaze"), a commercial radio station in Lincoln, Nebraska
KZNS-FM (97.5 FM, "The Blaze"), a commercial radio station in Coalville, Utah
Simulcast on KUDD (105.1 FM) in Manti, Utah
WKSC-FM (103.5 FM), a radio station in Chicago, Illinois, formerly branded as "The Blaze" from 1991 to 1994
KKBZ (105.1 FM, "The Blaze"), a radio station in Fresno, California

Sports
 Carol Blazejowski (born 1956), American professional basketball executive and retired player nicknamed "The Blaze"
 The Blaze (women's cricket), an English women's cricket team

Other uses
 The Blaze (band), a French electronica duo
 TheBlaze (magazine), an American magazine

See also
 Blaze (disambiguation)